Chieti Cathedral is a Roman Catholic cathedral in Chieti (Abruzzo, Italy), dedicated to Saint Justin of Chieti (San Giustino). Formerly the episcopal seat of the Diocese of Chieti, it is now the seat of the Archbishops of Chieti-Vasto.

The cathedral was constructed in the 9th century and rebuilt in the 13th.

See also

Notes

Chieti
Roman Catholic cathedrals in Italy
Cathedrals in Abruzzo
Churches in the province of Chieti
Romanesque architecture in Abruzzo